Pratt Lake is a lake in the U.S. state of Michigan.

Pratt Lake was named after one Mr. Pratt, a businessperson who rented cabins at the lake to visitors.

References

Bodies of water of Gladwin County, Michigan